Raul Talmar (born 6 January 1959 in Tallinn) is an Estonian choral conductor.

He has graduated from 22th High School in Tallinn and in 1977 Tallinn State Conservatory.

Since 2008, he is teaching choir conducting at Tallinn University. He is also the chairman of the Board of Estonian Song and Dance Festival. He has been the chairman of Estonian Choral Association.

He has conducted the Estonian Song Festival on numerous occasions.

In 2012, he was awarded with Order of the White Star, V class.

References

External links
Raul Talmar at Spotify

1959 births
Living people
Estonian choral conductors
Recipients of the Order of the White Star, 5th Class